Ahmad Herman Abanda (born 20 February 1984 in Yaoundé) is a former Cameroonian footballer who played as a defender. He spent the majoirty of his career playing in Indonesia for PSM Makassar, Persija Jakarta, Persema Malang, Persib Bandung and Barito Putera.

In 2013, Abanda converted to Islam while playing for Persib.

Honours
Canon Yaoundé
Elite One: 2002

References

External links

1984 births
Living people
Converts to Islam
Cameroonian Muslims
Cameroonian footballers
Expatriate footballers in Indonesia
Liga 1 (Indonesia) players
PSM Makassar players
Persija Jakarta players
Persema Malang players
Persib Bandung players
PS Barito Putera players
Association football defenders